

456001–456100 

|-bgcolor=#f2f2f2
| colspan=4 align=center | 
|}

456101–456200 

|-bgcolor=#f2f2f2
| colspan=4 align=center | 
|}

456201–456300 

|-bgcolor=#f2f2f2
| colspan=4 align=center | 
|}

456301–456400 

|-id=378
| 456378 Akashikaikyo ||  || The Akashi Kaikyo Bridge is the longest suspended bridge in the world. Its main span is 1991 meters long. It joins the city of Kobe on Honshu Island to Awaji island, passing over the strait of Akashi. || 
|}

456401–456500 

|-bgcolor=#f2f2f2
| colspan=4 align=center | 
|}

456501–456600 

|-bgcolor=#f2f2f2
| colspan=4 align=center | 
|}

456601–456700 

|-id=627
| 456627 Cristianmartins ||  || Cristian Martins (born 2005), from Campos dos Goytacazes, Brazil, is a student at Escola Municipal Dr. Getlio Vargas. He participates in the International Astronomical Search Collaboration, having made many asteroid observations and discoveries. Name suggested by P. Miller. || 
|-id=677
| 456677 Yepeijian ||  || Ye Peijian (born 1945), a Chinese aerospace engineer and member of the Chinese Academy of Sciences || 
|}

456701–456800 

|-id=731
| 456731 Uligrözinger ||  || Ulrich Grözinger (born 1952) worked from 1979 to 2018 as an all-round engineer at MPIA Heidelberg. He contributed to many infrared space missions (including ISO, Herschel, and JWST) with his vast knowledge in electronics and cryoengineering. He developed and built the control system of the telescope used for the discovery. || 
|}

456801–456900 

|-bgcolor=#f2f2f2
| colspan=4 align=center | 
|}

456901–457000 

|-bgcolor=#f2f2f2
| colspan=4 align=center | 
|}

References 

456001-457000